Hendrik Joseph Dillens (1812 in Ghent – 1872 in Brussels), a Belgian genre painter. He executed several pleasing and spirited paintings, among the best of which are:

The French Trooper caressing his Child.
The Capture of the Maid of Orleans.
An Old Man giving Counsel to Two Youths.
Consecration of a Church (with over 200 figures).

References

 

Belgian genre painters
1812 births
1872 deaths
Artists from Ghent
19th-century Belgian painters
19th-century Belgian male artists